Reports in K.B. and C.P., from 1746 to 1779 is the title of a collection of nominate reports, by Sir William Blackstone, of cases decided between approximately 1746 and 1780. For the purpose of citation their name may be abbreviated to "Black W" or "Bl W". They are in two volumes. They are reprinted in volume 96 of the English Reports.

In 1847, John Gage Marvin said:

References
Blackstone, W. Reports in K.B. and C.P., from 1746 to 1779; with numerous additional notes, references, and an entire new and copious index, by C. H. Elsley. 2 vols. 8vo. London. 1828.

External links
Blackstone, William and Elsley, Charles Heneage. Reports of Cases determined in the several Courts of Westminster Hall, from 1746 to 1779. Second Edition. London. 1828. Vols 1 and 2.

Sets of reports reprinted in the English Reports
Court of Common Pleas (England)